The Yellow River (historically known as the Chester River or the Middle River) is a  river in the southern United States which runs through Alabama and Florida. It empties into Blackwater Bay, an arm of Pensacola Bay. In 1773 Thomas Hutchins reported to the American Philosophical Society on the rivers. 

54 miles of the Yellow River are part of the Yellow River Paddling Trail, managed by the Florida Department of Environmental Protection.

See also
 List of rivers of Alabama
 List of rivers of Florida

References

Rivers of Florida
Rivers of Alabama
Bodies of water of Covington County, Alabama
Bodies of water of Okaloosa County, Florida
Bodies of water of Santa Rosa County, Florida